Japan–Palestine relations are the relations between Japan and the Palestinian National Authority. Japan is actively providing assistance to the Palestinians. During the period 1993–2002, economic aid was provided, totaling $630 million, at an annual average of $85 million, through UNRWA, the United Nations Development Programme and UNICEF. Yasser Arafat, Chairman of the Palestine Liberation Organization and the first President of the State of Palestine, paid four visits to Japan between 1996 and 2000. Japanese Prime Minister Tomiichi Murayama also paid a visit, the first of its kind, to the Palestinian Authority in 1995. In October 2001, former Prime Minister Ryutaro Hashimoto denied the existence of a direct link between the roots of international terrorism and the Palestinian people's struggle for their legitimate rights and called on Israel to implement international resolutions to advance the peace process.

See also 
 Foreign relations of Japan
 Foreign relations of Palestine
 Japan–Arab League relations

References 

Palestine
Bilateral relations of the State of Palestine